Canal 26 is an Argentine news pay television channel operated by Grupo Telecentro, a cable television provider from Buenos Aires. It broadcasts from La Matanza Partido, although its studios are located in Capital Federal, Capital City from Argentina. Founded in the  mid‑1990s as a variety channel, it soon evolved in a 24-hour news channel, although it also shows some music and special interest shows.

Canal 26 can be normally tuned on channel 4, although Telecentro, cable operator from the same company, chooses to offer it on channels 11 and 26. It can be also tuned via UHF on some parts of Buenos Aires on channel 26.

External links
26noticias.com

24-hour television news channels in Argentina
Spanish-language television stations
Television channels and stations established in 1996
Mass media in Buenos Aires